The National Junior Classical League (National JCL or NJCL) is a youth organization of secondary school students sponsored by the American Classical League (ACL).  Founded in 1936, the NJCL comprises more than 1,000 Latin, Greek and Classical chapters in the United States, Canada, South Korea and the United Kingdom, and with over 45,000 members, is the largest Classical organization in the world today.  Its mission: "to encourage an interest in and an appreciation of the language, literature and culture of ancient Greece and Rome and to impart an understanding of the debt of our own culture to that of classical antiquity."  The current NJCL National Committee Chair is Mr. Kyle McGimsey.

NJCL official colors are Roman purple and gold. It sponsors a Latin Honor Society and Greek Honor Society for high school students.

History
The idea of creating a junior organization to the American Classical League was first proposed in 1927 at the organization's annual meeting. A committee was appointed to study the matter, but it decided two years later that it wouldn't be worth pursuing at the time. In 1936, a pin was made and lifetime membership cost thirty cents, as it was decided to pursue the creation of a junior organization. The Junior Classical League was announced in November 1936 in Classical Outlook, with headquarters being established at New York University.

Today, chapters exist in the United States, Canada, and Australia and has over 50,000 members.

National convention

The NJCL hosts a week-long national convention annually at a college campus in late July or early August, where 1200–1500 students compete in academic tests, graphic and creative arts competitions, and meet many classics students from around the country.

Other components of the convention in which students may participate include Certamen, a quizbowl-like trivia competition, seminars commonly known as Colloquia, and Ludi (literally "games"—various athletic and recreational events).  Students may also campaign for public offices within the NJCL, including President, Treasurer, and Historian. Starting regularly in 1972, every convention is given a motto/theme from Latin poetry or literature.  A theme for the following year's convention is chosen by the incoming president each year.

Most state-level NJCL chapters hold their own annual conventions at locations central to their attendees, where schools compete in varied events. These events are divided into academic levels for scoring purposes; participation can be countywide, regional, or even statewide. Awards are given out to schools based on sweepstakes points, earned by placing high in competitive events.

The 2018 national convention was held at Miami University in Oxford, Ohio from July 23-28.  The 2019 national convention was held at North Dakota State University in Fargo, North Dakota from July 26-31.  The 2020 national convention was held digitally due to the COVID-19 pandemic from July 24-29.

State chapters

As of 2010, forty-seven U.S. states, the District of Columbia, three Canadian provinces, and the United Kingdom each maintain a state (or state-level) chapter of the NJCL; the current total number is 51 as Oregon, Washington, state, and British Columbia share a chapter. under the moniker Cascadia JCL. Many chapters hold their own annual State Convention in addition to the National Convention.

Publications
Torch: U.S. is the NJCL's official publication, which details the events of the organization, reports scores, and issues stories.  Published four times a year, the only issue sent to all convention attendees (including non-subscribers) is the fall issue, shortly after convention.

Until October 2007, the NJCL also published JCL Highlights in months when the Torch: U.S. was not published. JCL Highlights publicized administrative details about the League, including details about applying for JCL scholarships, information about the upcoming Convention, and requests for information from NJCL officers and national committee members.  According to the Fall 2007 Torch: U.S., the National Committee decided at the October 2007 Fall Planning Meeting to eliminate the JCL Highlights in favor of online distribution of the same information.

During national conventions, a student published newspaper, The Convention Ear, is produced. The Ear highlights convention events and gives information about candidates for NJCL office.

See also
 National Senior Classical League (NSCL) – The college-level affiliate of NJCL
 Living Latin – A movement dedicated to promoting spoken Latin
 Ontario Student Classics Conference – An annual conference begun in 1968 which has roots in the National Junior Classical League.

References

External links

American Classical League
Classical associations and societies
Organizations based in Ohio
Youth organizations established in 1936
High school honor societies